A Wife's Sacrifice is a lost 1916 American silent drama film directed by J. Gordon Edwards and produced and distributed by Fox Film Corporation.

Cast

See also
List of Fox Film films
1937 Fox vault fire

References

External links

1916 films
American silent feature films
Lost American films
Films directed by J. Gordon Edwards
1916 drama films
Silent American drama films
Fox Film films
American black-and-white films
1916 lost films
Lost drama films
1910s American films